Sir Roger Martyn Carr (born 22 December 1946) is a British businessman. He is the chairman of BAE Systems, a position he will relinquish in 2023.

Early life and education 
Carr was born and grew up in Nottingham, the son of a car dealer father and ballet teacher mother. After leaving school he worked for Boots as a computer programmer and the company sent him to read business at Trent Polytechnic. He was eventually poached by Honeywell, and installed mainframes in some of Britain's biggest companies.

He attended Nottingham High School and graduated with a BA in Business Studies from Trent Polytechnic, now Nottingham Trent University.

Career 
He has been on the board of eight companies, including BAE Systems, Centrica plc, Mitchells & Butlers, Cadbury plc,  Chubb Locks, Thames Water and Williams Holdings.

Carr's first period on a company board began in 1994 when he became CEO of Williams Holdings. In 2000, Williams Holdings demerged into Chubb and Kidde, and Carr became the chairman of Chubb.

In 1998 Carr became chairman of Thames Water, stepping down in 2000.

In 2003 he became the chairman of Mitchells & Butlers, a British company that owns over 2,000 pubs and restaurants. He stepped down as chairman in 2008.

He became chairman of Centrica in 2004.

In 2008 Carr became the chairman of Cadbury plc, the United Kingdom's largest confectionery manufacturer. He resigned on 3 February 2010 when the company was bought by Kraft Foods.

Carr was knighted in the 2011 New Year Honours for services to business.

He was President of the Confederation of British Industry from June 2011. Carr was succeeded in the role by Sir Michael Rake in June 2013.

In June 2013 BAE Systems announced that Carr was to join the board as a non-executive director and chairman designate on 1 October 2013, and that he would succeed Dick Olver as chairman in the first quarter of 2014.

In March 2015 it was announced that Carr had been appointed as the vice-chairman of the BBC Trust and would serve on the BBC's governing body for four years.

Other interests

Carr is the chairman of the English National Ballet.

References

External links

1946 births
Living people
British chief executives in the energy industry
Business people from Nottingham
Alumni of Nottingham Trent University
BAE Systems people
British chairpersons of corporations
Centrica people
Knights Bachelor
Mitchells & Butlers
People educated at Nottingham High School
Thames Water